Marcus Valerius Messalla can refer to:

 Marcus Valerius Messalla (consul 226 BC)
 Marcus Valerius Messalla (consul 188 BC)
 Marcus Valerius Messalla (consul 161 BC)
 Marcus Valerius Messalla Niger, consul in 61 BC
 Marcus Valerius Messalla Rufus, consul in 53 BC
 Marcus Valerius Messalla (consul 32 BC)
 Marcus Valerius Messalla Corvinus, consul in 31 BC
 Marcus Valerius Messalla Messallinus, consul in 3 BC
 Marcus Valerius Messala Barbatus (consul 20 AD)
 Marcus Valerius Messalla Corvinus (consul 58)